Heatwork is the combined effect of temperature and time. It is important to several industries:

Ceramics
Glass and metal annealing
Metal heat treating

Pyrometric devices can be used to gauge heat work as they deform or contract due to heatwork to produce temperature equivalents. Within tolerances, firing can be undertaken at lower temperatures for a longer period to achieve comparable results. When the amount of heatwork of two firings is the same, the pieces may look identical, but there may be differences not visible, such as mechanical strength and microstructure. Heatwork is taught in material science courses, but is not a precise measurement or a valid scientific concept.

External links 
Temperature equivalents table & description of Bullers Rings.
Temperature equivalents table  & description of Nimra Cerglass pyrometric cones. 
Temperature equivalents table & description of Orton pyrometric cones. 
Temperature equivalents table of Seger pyrometric cones.
Temperature Equivalents, °F & °C for Bullers Ring.

Glass physics
Pottery
Metallurgy
Ceramic engineering